is a Japanese TV and film actor. He joined modeling competitions and was active in Checkmate and other fashion magazines. In 2001, Tamayama debuted in Hyakujuu Sentai Gaoranger as GaoSilver. He continued to star in more movies and TV dramas such as Casshern, Tokyo Love Cinema, and Rockers.

Filmography

Movies
 Hyakujuu Sentai Gaoranger Hi no Yama Hoeru (2001)
 Koi ni Utaeba (To Sing of Love) (2002)
 Samurai Girl 21 (2002)
 Rockers (2003)
 Koibumi Hiyori~Ikarusu no Koibito Tachi (2004)
 Tengoku no Honya: Koibi (Heaven's Bookstore) (2004)
 Casshern (2004)
 Eiko (2004)
 Pray (2005)
 Nana (2005)
 Gyakkyou nine (All Out Nine-Field Of Nightmares) (2005)
 Presents: Aikagi (Presents: The Key of Love) (2006)
 Nana 2 (2006)
 Tegami (The Letters) (2006)
 Check It Out, Yo! (2006)
 Kamyu Nante Shiranai (Who’s Camus Anyway?) (2006) cameo
 Giniro no Season (Silver Season) (2007)
 Freesia (Bullets Over Tears) (2007)
 Team Batista no Eikou (2008)
 Kafuu wo Machiwabite / Waiting for Good News (2009)
 The Triumphant General Rouge (2009)
 Goemon (2009)
 Hagetaka: The Movie (The Vulture) (2009)
 The Glorious Team Batista 2 / General Rouge no Gaisen (2009)
 Shikeidai no Elevator (2010)
 Norwegian Wood / Norway no Mori (2010)
 Hankyū Densha (2011) as Ryuta
 Girl In The Sunny Place (2013) as Haruki Shindo
 Lupin III (2014) as Daisuke Jigen
 Ajin: Demi-Human (2017) as Yū Tosaki
 Once Hit the Bottom (2022) as Kōki Tachibana

TV dramas
 Utsukushii Hito (1999 TBS) in episode 5
 Tengoku no Kiss (1999 TV Asahi)
 Naomi (1999 Fuji TV) in episode 9
 Summer Snow (2000 TBS) in episodes 6 & 7
 Hyakujuu Sentai Gaoranger (2001-2002 TV Asahi)
 Bara no Jujika (2002 Fuji TV)
 Mayonaka wa Betsu no Kao (2002 NHK)
 Hakoiri Musume (2003 KTV)
 Message (NTV, 2003)
 Tokyo Love Cinema (2003 Fuji TV)
 Kotaba ga Uragitte Iku (2003 NTV)
 Kimi ga Omoide ni Naru Mae ni (2004 Fuji TV)
 Nouka no Yome ni Naritai (2004 NHK)
 Rikon Bengoshi (2004 Fuji TV)
 Division 1 Stage 5 "2H" (2004 Fuji TV)
 Brother Beat (2005 TBS)
 Hiroshima Showa 20 nen 8 Gatsu Muika (2005 TBS)
 Rikon Bengoshi 2 (2005 Fuji TV)
 Bokutachi no Sensou (2006 TBS)
 Dare Yorimo Mama wo Ai su (2006 TBS)
 Zutto Ai Takatta (2006 Fuji TV)
 Ushi ni Negai wo: Love & Farm (2007 Fuji TV)
 Mayonaka no March (2007 WOWOW)
 Bara no nai Hanaya (Fuji TV, 2008, ep8-11)
 Wild Life (NHK, 2008)
 Prisoner (WOWOW, 2008)
 Boushi - (2008 NHK Hiroshima)
 Tenchijin (2009 NHK), Uesugi Kagetora
 BOSS (Fuji TV, 2009)
 Sunao ni Narenakute (Fuji TV, 2010)
 Wagaya no Rekishi (Fuji TV, 2010)
 BOSS 2 (Fuji TV, 2011)
 Shiawase ni Narou yo (Fuji TV, 2011, ep7)
 Massan (2014 NHK)
 Samurai Gourmet (Netflix, 2017)
 Jimmy: The True Story of a True Idiot (Netflix, 2018), Sanma Akashiya
 Segodon (NHK, 2018), Kido Takayoshi
 Bakabon no Papa yori Baka na Papa (NHK, 2018), Fujio Akatsuka
 The Naked Director (Netflix, 2019)

TV commercials
 Meiji Chocolate (2000)
 P&G (2002)
 ECC Shonen (2003)
 Kagome (2003)
 Glico ZACS (2004)
 Santen FX Eye drops (2003–2007)
 Suntory (2005)
 Acecook Noodle (2005)

Promotional video
 Truth, starring Yuna Ito as Reira from Trapnest, Tetsuji as Takumi the bassist
 Endless Story, starring Yuna Ito as Reira from Trapnest, Tetsuji as Takumi the bassist

Awards

References

External links

1980 births
Living people
Japanese male television actors
Asadora lead actors
Japanese male actors of Korean descent
Japanese male film actors
Male actors from Kyoto
20th-century Japanese male actors
21st-century Japanese male actors